Grace Seixas Nathan (1752–1831) was a Jewish-American poet and a member of a prominent Sephradic family.

Biography 
Grace Seixas waas born on November 11, 1752, in Stratford, Connecticut. In 1780, she married Simon Nathan, a merchant and a supporter of the American revolution. The couple had one son, Isaac Mendes (born 1785–1852).
Seixas Nathan died in New York on November 8, 1831. Her poetry was never published in her lifetime. In 1947, some of her correspondence was published by the American Jewish Historical Society.

References 

Stratford, Connecticut
Jewish poets
Jewish women writers